Abdullah Hadhereti (born 10 August 1992) is a Saudi Arabian footballer who plays as a forward for Al-Kholood.

Career
Hadhereti began his career at the youth team of Al-Raed before joining Al-Shabab on January 31, 2013. On August 13, 2014, he left Al-Shabab and rejoined to Al-Raed. On September 3, 2015, Hadhereti joined Damac. After making 3 appearances in all competitions he left Damac and joined Sdoos on January 1, 2016. Hadhereti left Sdoos and joined Al-Ain on August 8, 2017. He helped Al-Ain achieve promotion to the MS League. On August 24, 2018, Hadhereti joined Al-Taqadom. He scored 14 goals as Al-Taqadom finished fourth and earned promotion to the MS League. On January 12, 2020, Hadhereti joined Al-Qadsiah on a six-month loan. He scored 12 goals in 17 appearances as Al-Qadsiah finished runners-up in the MS League. On 2 February 2021, Hadhereti joined Al-Jabalain on loan from Al-Qadsiah. On 21 July 2022, Hadhereti joined Pro League side Al-Adalah. On 1 January 2023, Hadhereti joined Al-Kholood.

References

External links
 

1992 births
Living people
Saudi Arabian footballers
Saudi Arabia youth international footballers
Association football forwards
Al-Raed FC players
Al-Shabab FC (Riyadh) players
Damac FC players
Sdoos Club players
Al-Ain FC (Saudi Arabia) players
Al-Taqadom FC players
Al-Qadsiah FC players
Al-Jabalain FC players
Al Jeel Club players
Al-Adalah FC players
Al-Kholood Club players
Saudi Professional League players
Saudi First Division League players
Saudi Second Division players